Mikko Haapakoski (born January 19, 1967 in Oulu, Finland) is a retired professional ice hockey defender. Haapakoski won bronze in 1986 and silver in 1987 in the Finnish national league, and was signed by the Detroit Red Wings in 1987.  However, they never played him in North America.

Career statistics

External links

1967 births
Living people
Detroit Red Wings draft picks
Finnish ice hockey defencemen
HC TPS players
Ilves players
Oulun Kärpät players
SC Bern players
Wiener EV players
Sportspeople from Oulu
20th-century Finnish people